is a passenger railway station located in the town of Kuroshio, Hata District, Kōchi Prefecture, Japan. It is operated by the Tosa Kuroshio Railway and has the station number "TK37".

Lines and services

Layout
The station consists of a lodge type building with a side platform serving one track. The building has a waiting area, ticket vending machines, a cafe and a convenience store. A bus shelter is at the station entrance. Car parks and bicycle sheds are to one side of the station. A wheelchair ramp leads from the station entrance to the platform.

Adjacent stations

|-
!colspan=5|Tosa Kuroshio Railway

History
The station opened on 1 October 1970 under the control of Japanese National Railways (JNR). After the privatization of JNR, control of the station passed to Tosa Kuroshio Railway on 1 April 1988.

Passenger statistics
In fiscal 2011, the station was used by an average of 262 passengers daily.

Surrounding area
 The station is located in the urban centre of Ōgata which is part of the town of Kuroshio.
 Kuroshio town office - just down the road about 160 m away.
 National Route 56 - runs parallel to the track nearby and through the urban centre of Ogata.
 Irino fishing port (入野漁港) - point of departure for whale watching excursions. 
 Tosa Southwest Large Scale Park, Ogata section (土佐西南大規模公園,大方町) - a recreational area with many sport facilities such as a gymnasium and tennis courts.
 Seaside art gallery (砂浜美術館) - an open-air art gallery set on a beach.

See also
 List of Railway Stations in Japan

References

External links

Railway stations in Kōchi Prefecture
Railway stations in Japan opened in 1970
Kuroshio, Kōchi